Hans Hagerup or posthumously Hans Hagerup Gyldenpalm (27 October 1717 – 19 February 1781) was a Danish-born, Norwegian jurist and civil servant. Upon his death, the King granted him a title of nobility, thus changing his surname and that of his descendants to Gyldenpalm.

Biography
Hans Hagerup was born at Kalundborg on the island of Zealand in Denmark. He was a son of Eiler Hagerup (1685–1743). He belonged to an old family from Trondheim, but was born in Denmark, where his father was then a priest. During the 1720s, he followed the family to Trondheim when his father was appointed successor to Thomas von Westen as chief of the Christian mission among the Sami people.

After studies at home, he was in 1731 sent to the University of Copenhagen by his father, who during the same year was appointed the Bishop of the Diocese of Nidaros. In 1734, his father arranged for him to be hired as a teacher at the Trondheim Cathedral School. Hagerup later traveled to Copenhagen, where he earned his law degree during 1736. He served as County governor of Nordlands amt starting in 1751. He was appointed General War Commissioner of Nordlands amt in 1762. He left those jobs during 1767 when he was appointed Diocesan Governor of Christianssands stiftamt as well as the County governor of Nedenes amt.

Personal life
Hagerup was married twice. In 1740, he married Anne Cathrine Sommer (1707-1745), the widow of Bailiff and postmaster Jens Hannibalsen Hammer (1674-1738). In 1748, he married Anne Margrethe Høyer (1701-1764), the widow of another county governor named Christian Soelgaard (1687-1742). He was the grandfather of Hans Hagerup Falbe. He died in 1781 and was granted a title of nobility and after his death his family surname was changed to Gyldenpalm or de Gyldenpalm.

See also
Gyldenpalm (noble family)

References

1717 births
1781 deaths
People from Kalundborg
University of Copenhagen alumni
County governors of Norway
County governors of Nordland